Flattened rice is a type of rice dish made from raw, toasted, or parboiled rice grains pounded into flat flakes. They are eaten as is, toasted, fried, or used as ingredients or toppings for other dishes. Depending on their use, they can be crispy, crunchy, chewy, or soft in texture with a light nutty flavor. They are traditional to many rice-cultivating cultures in Southeast Asia and South Asia. It is also known variously as rice flakes, beaten rice, pounded rice, pressed rice or chipped rice.

South Asia

Flattened rice is a breakfast staple in South Asia where it is known as poha, pauwa, avalakki, chivda, or aval (அவல் ) among many other names. It is particularly popular in India, Nepal, and Bangladesh. Poha is made by de-husking rice grains and then parboiling or soaking them in hot water for 45 minutes. They are then dried, roasted, and then flattened with rollers. They usually come in thin, medium, and thick varieties. Thinner varieties are ideal for cooking and use in desserts, while thicker varieties are ideal for deep-frying.

Poha can be eaten as snacks or cooked into various sweet, savory, or spicy dishes.

Southeast Asia

Cambodia

Flattened rice is known in Cambodia as ambok. It is made by toasting newly-harvested rice (with husks on) on a wok, then pounding the heated rice with a large wooden mortar and pestle until flat. The husks are then removed. Ambok plays a very significant role in the Cambodian Water Festival (Bon Om Touk). They are commonly eaten mixed with bananas, palm sugar, and coconut water; or roasted together with small shrimp.

Philippines

Flattened rice in the Philippines is called pinipig. It is made using immature glutinous rice grains, giving it a distinctive greenish color. It is de-husked first, pounded in a mortar with a pestle, and then toasted or baked until crisp. They have a crunchy exterior with a chewy center. They are commonly eaten plain, used as toppings in desserts and drinks, or made into cakes.

A notable variant of the pinipig from Pampanga is the duman, which differs in that it is toasted first before being pounded. It is celebrated annually in the Duman Festival of Santa Rita, Pampanga.

Thailand
Flattened rice is known as khao mao in Thailand. Similar to the Philippine variant, it uses immature glutinous rice grains and is also green in color. It is made by soaking de-husked rice grains in water for several hours, steaming it in a bamboo container, toasting it in a wok, and then pounding it flat in a mortar with a pestle.

Vietnam

Flattened rice in Vietnam is known as cốm. It is also green in color. It is made by toasting immature rice grains in low heat and then pounding it flat in a mortar with a pestle. The husk is removed afterwards via winnowing. It can be eaten plain, used as an ingredient in other dishes, or made into cakes known as bánh cốm. It is commonly eaten during the Autumn season.

Myanmar
Flattened rice in Myanmar is known as mont hsan. In Lower Myanmar, it is traditionally given as an offering to U Shin Gyi, a guardian nat (spirit) of waterways. Mont hsan is also consumed in the Upper Myanmar, and is used as an ingredient in Burmese sweets called mont.

See also
Rolled oats
Puffed rice
Rice Krispies
 List of rice dishes

References

Breakfast cereals
Rice dishes